Bottom Bay is located on the southeast coast of Barbados, with Palmetto Bay to the north, and Cave Bay, Crane Beach and Sam Lord's Castle to the south.

References 

Bays of Barbados